Oscar Solomon Straus (December 23, 1850 – May 3, 1926) was an American politician and diplomat. He served as United States Secretary of Commerce and Labor under President Theodore Roosevelt from 1906 to 1909, making him the first Jewish United States Cabinet Secretary. Straus also served in four presidential administrations as America's representative to the Ottoman Empire and ran for Governor of New York in 1912 as the Progressive Party candidate.

Early life and education 
He was born in Otterberg, Germany. He emigrated with his parents to the United States, and settled in Talbotton, Georgia. The Straus family owned slaves and conducted business with other slave owners, taking several formerly enslaved people to the North with the family following the defeat of the Confederacy. At the close of the Civil War he moved to New York City where he graduated from Columbia College in 1871 and Columbia Law School in 1873. He practiced law until 1881, and then became a merchant, retaining his interest in literature.

Diplomatic career 
He first served as United States Minister to the Ottoman Empire from 1887 to 1889 and again from 1898 to 1899.

At the outbreak of the Philippine–American War in 1899, Secretary of State John Hay asked Strauss to approach Sultan Abdul Hamid II to request that the Sultan write a letter to the Moro Sulu Muslims of the Sulu Sultanate telling them to submit to American suzerainty and American military rule. The Sulu sultanate agreed, with Straus writing that the "Sulu Mohammedans ... refused to join the insurrectionists and had placed themselves under the control of our army, thereby recognizing American sovereignty."

President McKinley sent a personal letter of thanks to Straus and said that its accomplishment had saved the United States at least twenty thousand troops in the field." 

The Moro Rebellion then broke out in 1904 with war raging between the Americans and Moro Muslims and atrocities committed against Moro Muslim women and children such as the Moro Crater Massacre.

On January 14, 1902, he was named a member of the Permanent Court of Arbitration at The Hague to fill the place left vacant by the death of ex-President Benjamin Harrison.

Career as Secretary of Commerce and Labor and Ambassador to Ottoman Empire

In December 1906, Straus became the United States Secretary of Commerce and Labor under President Theodore Roosevelt. This position also placed him in charge of the United States Bureau of Immigration. During his tenure, Straus ordered immigration inspectors to work closely with local police and the United States Secret Service to find, arrest and deport immigrants with Anarchist political beliefs under the terms of the Anarchist Exclusion Act.  

Straus left the Commerce Department in 1909 when William Howard Taft became president. Taft appointed him U.S. Ambassador to the Ottoman Empire 1909-1910. During the Presidency of William Howard Taft, an American strategy was to become involved in business transactions rather than military confrontations, a policy known as Dollar Diplomacy. It failed with respect to the Ottoman Empire because of opposition from ambassador Straus  and to Turkish vacillation under pressure from the entrenched European powers who did not wish to see American competition. American trade remained a minor factor.

In 1912, he ran unsuccessfully for Governor of New York on the Progressive and Independence League tickets. In 1915, he became chairman of the public service commission of New York State.

He was president of the American Jewish Historical Society. He is buried at Beth El Cemetery in Ridgewood, New York.

Family
The Straus family had several influential members including Straus's grandson Roger W. Straus, Jr., who started the publishing company of  Farrar, Straus and Giroux; his brother, Isidor Straus, who perished aboard the RMS Titanic in 1912, served as a representative from New York City's 15th District, and was co-owner of the department store R. H. Macy & Co. along with another brother, Nathan; and nephew Jesse Isidor Straus, confidant of Franklin Delano Roosevelt and Ambassador to France from 1933 to 1936.

In 1882, Strauss married Sarah Lavanburg. They had three children: Mildred Straus Schafer (born 1883), Aline Straus Hockstader (born 1889), and Roger Williams Straus (born 1891).

His grandson is Oscar Schafer, Chairman emeritus of the New York Philharmonic.

Legacy
Washington, D.C., commemorates the achievements of this famous Jewish-German-American statesman in the Oscar Straus Memorial.

Works
The Origin of the Republican Form of Government in the United States (1886)
Roger Williams, the Pioneer of Religious Liberty (1894)
The Development of Religious Liberty in the United States (1896)
Reform in the Consular Service (1897)
United States Doctrine of Citizenship (1901)
Our Diplomacy with Reference to our Foreign Service (1902)
The American Spirit (1913)
Under Four Administrations, his memoirs (1922)

See also 
 List of foreign-born United States Cabinet members

References

Further reading
 Brand, Katharine E. "The Oscar S. Straus Papers." Quarterly Journal of Current Acquisitions 7.2 (1950): 3-6. at the Library of Congress
 Cohen, Naomi W. A Dual Heritage: The Public Career of Oscar S. Straus (1969).
 Cohen, Naomi W. "Ambassador Straus in Turkey, 1909-1910: A Note on Dollar Diplomacy." Mississippi Valley Historical Review 45.4 (1959): 632-642. online

 Medoff, Rafael, and Chaim I. Waxman. Historical Dictionary of Zionism (Routledge, 2013).
 Strauss, L. L. "Oscar S. Straus, an Appreciation." (American Jewish Historical Society, 1950) online.

External links 
 Straus Historical Society
 
 
 

|-

|-

|-

1850 births
1926 deaths
19th-century American diplomats
20th-century American diplomats
20th-century American politicians
Ambassadors of the United States to the Ottoman Empire
American people of German-Jewish descent
American Reform Jews
Columbia Law School alumni
German emigrants to the United States
German Reform Jews
Straus family
Jewish American people in New York (state) politics
Jewish American members of the Cabinet of the United States
New York (state) Republicans
New York (state) Progressives (1912)
People from Kaiserslautern (district)
People from Talbotton, Georgia
People from the Kingdom of Bavaria
Theodore Roosevelt administration cabinet members
United States Independence Party politicians
United States Secretaries of Commerce and Labor
Lawyers from New York City
Writers from New York City
Columbia College (New York) alumni